The Avril Lavigne Tour was the fifth concert tour by Canadian recording artist Avril Lavigne. The tour was supporting her fifth studio album, Avril Lavigne (2013). Beginning December 2013, the tour played over 78 concerts in America and Asia.

In the United States, Lavigne served as opening act for the Backstreet Boys' In a World Like This Tour.

Opening acts
Patent Pending 
This Is All Now

Setlist 
The following setlist was obtained from the May 13, 2014 concert, held at Arena Monterrey in Monterrey, Mexico. It does not represent all concerts for the duration of the tour. 

"Hello Kitty"
"Girlfriend"
"Rock N Roll"
"Here's to Never Growing Up"
"Smile"
"My Happy Ending"
"Don't Tell Me"
"I Always Get What I Want"
"I'm with You"
"Bad Girl"  (contains elements of "The Beautiful People") 
"He Wasn't"
"Sk8er Boi"
Encore
"Song 2"
"What the Hell"
"Complicated"

Tour dates

Festivals and other miscellaneous performances
MixMas
Jingle Ball
Let It Show
Mistletoe Show
O Starry Night
Mistletoe Meltdown
All Star Christmas
Jingle Jam
Jingle Bell Ball
Summer Sonic Festival

Box office score data

References

External links
Avril Lavigne Official Website

2013 concert tours
2014 concert tours
Avril Lavigne concert tours